Proposed Studies on the Implications of Peaceful Space Activities for Human Affairs, often referred to as "the Brookings Report", was a 1960 report commissioned by NASA and created by the Brookings Institution in collaboration with NASA's Committee on Long-Range Studies.  It was submitted to the House Committee on Science and Astronautics of the United States House of Representatives in the 87th United States Congress on April 18, 1961.

Significance
The report has become noted for one short section entitled "The implications of a discovery of extraterrestrial life", which examines the potential implications of such a discovery on public attitudes and values. The section briefly considers possible public reactions to some possible scenarios for the discovery of extraterrestrial life, stressing a need for further research in this area. It recommended continuing studies to determine the likely social impact of such a discovery and its effects on public attitudes, including study of the question of how leadership should handle information about such a discovery and under what circumstances leaders might or might not find it advisable to withhold such information from the public. The significance of this section of the report is a matter of controversy. Persons who believe that extraterrestrial life has already been confirmed and that this information is being withheld by government from the public sometimes turn to this section of the report as support for their view. Frequently cited passages from this section of the report are drawn both from its main body and from its footnotes.

The report has been mentioned in newspapers such as The New York Times, The Baltimore Sun, The Washington Times, and the Huffington Post.

Background and context 
The report was entered into the Congressional Record, which is currently archived at over 1110 libraries as part of the Federal Depository Library Program.

The main author Donald N. Michael was a "social psychologist with a background in the natural sciences." "He was a fellow of the American Association for the Advancement of Science, the American Psychological Association, the Society for the Psychological Study of Social Issues and the World Academy of Art and Science."

Over 50 years after the report was initially released the Brookings Institution again focused on space policy by hosting "several panels of experts to discuss topics such as the economic benefits of private industry’s involvement, the scientific discoveries resulting from NASA’s continued space efforts and the potential for future exploration, and the government’s policies and decision making process."

Content
Although the report discusses the need for research on many policy issues related to space exploration, it is most often cited for passages from its brief section on the implications of a discovery of extraterrestrial life. (See Section #Use in discussions about possible cover-ups)

Table of contents 
The report contains the following chapters:
 Introduction: Goals and Methods
 Comments on the Organization and Functions of a NASA Social Science Research Capability
 Implications of Satellite-Based Communications Systems
 Implications of a Space-Derived Weather Predicting System
 The Implications of Technological By-products
 Implications for Government Operations and Personnel Use
 Implications for Space Industries
 General Implications for International Affairs and Foreign Policy
 Attitudes and Values
 positivity and unity

Quotes from the report 
In a short section the report touches on the possibility of detecting evidence of extraterrestrial life and its implications, which includes the following passages:
While face-to-face meetings with it will not occur within the next twenty years [that is the 1960s and 1970s] (unless its technology is more advanced than ours, qualifying it to visit Earth), artifacts left at some point in time by these life forms might possibly be discovered through our space activities on the Moon, Mars, or Venus.

Anthropological files contain many examples of societies, sure of their place in the universe, which have disintegrated when they have had to associate with previously unfamiliar societies espousing different ideas and different life ways; others that survived such an experience usually did so by paying the price of changes in values and attitudes and behavior.

Since intelligent life might be discovered at any time via the radio telescope research presently under way, and since the consequences of such a discovery are presently unpredictable because of our limited knowledge of behavior under even an approximation of such dramatic circumstances, two research areas can be recommended:
 Continuing studies to determine emotional and intellectual understanding and attitudes -- and successive alterations of them if any -- regarding the possibility and consequences of discovering intelligent extraterrestrial life.
 Historical and empirical studies of the behavior of peoples and their leaders when confronted with dramatic and unfamiliar events or social pressures. Such studies might help to provide programs for meeting and adjusting to the implications of such a discovery. Questions one might wish to answer by such studies would include:  How might such information, under what circumstances, be presented to or withheld from the public for what ends? What might be the role of the discovering scientists and other decision makers regarding release of the fact of discovery?

An individual's reactions to such a radio contact would in part depend on his cultural, religious, and social background, as well as on the actions of those he considered authorities and leaders, and their behavior, in turn, would in part depend on their cultural, social, and religious environment. The discovery would certainly be front-page news everywhere; the degree of political or social repercussion would probably depend on leadership's interpretation of (1) its own role, (2) threats to that role, and (3) national and personal opportunities to take advantage of the disruption or reinforcement of the attitudes and values of others. Since leadership itself might have great need to gauge the direction and intensity of public attitudes, to strengthen its own morale and for decision making purposes, it would be most advantageous to have more to go on than personal opinions about the opinions of the public and other leadership groups.

The knowledge that life existed in other parts of the universe might lead to a greater unity of men on Earth, based on the 'oneness' of man or on the age-old assumption that any stranger is threatening. Much would depend on what, if anything, was communicated between man and the other beings...

Quotes from the footnotes 
Some footnotes also relate to detecting evidence of extraterrestrial life, for example:

The positions of the major American religious denominations, the Christian sects, and the Eastern religions on the matter of extraterrestrial life need elucidation. Consider the following: 'The Fundamentalist (and anti-science) sects are growing apace around the world... For them, the discovery of other life -- rather than any other space product -- would be electrifying. ...some scattered studies need to be made both in their home centers and churches and their missions, in relation to attitudes about space activities and extraterrestrial life.'

If plant life or some subhuman intelligence were found on Mars or Venus, for example, there is on the face of it no good reason to suppose these discoveries, after the original novelty had been exploited to the fullest and worn off, would result in substantial changes in perspectives or philosophy in large parts of the American public, at least any more than, let us say, did the discovery of the coelacanth or the panda.

If super intelligence is discovered, the results become quite unpredictable. It is possible that if the intelligence of these creatures were sufficiently superior to ours, they would choose to have little if any contact with us. On the face of it, there is no reason to believe that we might learn a great deal from them, especially if their physiology and psychology were substantially different from ours.

It has been speculated that, of all groups, scientists and engineers might be the most devastated by the discovery of relatively superior creatures, since these professions are most clearly associated with the mastery of nature, rather than with the understanding and expression of man. Advanced understanding of nature might vitiate all our theories at the very least, if not also require a culture and perhaps a brain inaccessible to Earth scientists.

It is perhaps interesting to note that when asked what the consequences of the discovery of superior life would be, an audience of Saturday Review readership chose, for the most part, not to answer the question at all, in spite of their detailed answers to many other speculative questions.

A possible but not completely satisfactory means for making the possibility 'real' for many people would be to confront them with present speculations about the I.Q. of the porpoise and to encourage them to expand on the implications of this situation.

Such studies would include historical reactions to hoaxes, psychic manifestations, unidentified flying objects, etc. Hadley Cantril's study, Invasion from Mars (Princeton University Press, 1940), would provide a useful if limited guide in this area. Fruitful understanding might be gained from a comparative study of factors affecting the responses of primitive societies to exposure to technologically advanced societies. Some thrived, some endured, and some died.

Use in discussions about possible cover-ups 
The report is sometimes mentioned in discussions about possible government cover-ups of evidence of extraterrestrial life, such as discussions under blog entries of skeptic astronomer Phil Plait. Sometimes these mentions point out the existence of the report, sometimes they argue that the report is evidence of extraterrestrial life. For example, Richard C. Hoagland, a proponent of conspiracy theories, argues that the report, by outlining plausible motives for government suppression of a discovery of extraterrestrial intelligence, furnishes evidence of an ongoing cover-up of intelligent extraterrestrial life already discovered. The National Investigations Committee On Aerial Phenomena thinks the "report gives weight to previous thinking by scholars who have suggested that the earth already may be under close scrutiny by advanced space races."

In an email published by The Virtually Strange Network, entitled "Brookings Report Re-examined", Keith Woodard writes that the Brookings Report:...did raise the possibility of withholding information, but took no position on its advisability. 'Questions one might wish to answer by such studies,' intoned the report, 'would include: how might such information, under what circumstances, be presented to or withheld from the public for what ends?  What might be the role of the discovering scientists and other decision makers regarding release of the fact of discovery?' Those two sentences comprise the report's entire commentary on the subject of covering up the truth.

See also
Search for extraterrestrial intelligence
Post-detection policy
Potential cultural impact of extraterrestrial contact

References

External links
 Main report via the Internet Archive copy of the NASA technical reports server.

Astrobiology
Spaceflight
Government responses to UFOs
1960 documents